Addyme werkodara is a species of snout moth in the genus Addyme. It was described by Roesler and Küppers, in 1979, and is known from Sumatra, Indonesia.

References

Moths described in 1979
Phycitini
Moths of Asia